Llanberis F.C. are a Welsh football club currently playing in the North Wales Coast West Football League Premier Division. Their ground is located in the centre of the village. Their nickname is Y Darans.

History

Llanberis F.C. were founded in 1890. Dr. Robert Herbert Mills-Roberts, a former Preston North End and Wales goalkeeper who graduated as a doctor in July 1887. A few years later he took over the running of the Dinorwic Slate Quarry Hospital, and it was during this time he became one of the founding fathers of Llanberis F.C.

However, Llanberis F.C. have been known as Llanberis United from the early 1900s until 1920 and CPD Locomotive Llanberis from 1980 until 2004 when they were sponsored by the Snowdon Mountain Railway.

Llanberis F.C. former nicknames were: Llanber, Y Blac and Amber, Y Teigars, Locomotives and Y Loco.

References

External links
 Club website
 Facebook
 Twitter

Llanberis
Football clubs in Wales
Welsh Alliance League clubs
1890 establishments in Wales
North Wales Coast Football League clubs
Caernarfon & District League clubs
Gwynedd League clubs
Welsh National League (North) clubs
Bangor & District League clubs
Welsh League North clubs
North Wales Coast League clubs